One Independence Center is a high-rise office building located in Uptown Charlotte, North Carolina. It was completed in 1983 and stands at a height of 301 ft (92 m) with 20 floors.  It is the seventh largest building in Charlotte by leasable square feet with 565,694 square feet. It sits on the former site of the Independence Building at Charlotte's Independence Square.

History
The building was finished in 1983.  It is the site of the former Independence Building which was constructed in 1909, it was demolished in September 1981. At its opening The Independence Building with 12 floors was the tallest building in North Carolina.

The developers Faison firm and Williams Realty of Tulsa, Oklahoma announced in October 1981 the specifics of the building. NCNB, now Bank of America, planned to lease  on floors 2 - 10. The building was built diagonal from NCNB Plaza, the bank headquarters in 1981. Therefore, the building was planned to be an extension of the bank's headquarters. The building was forecasted to cost $48 million.

The bank moved 700 employees into the building in August 1983. At the time this accounted for about  a third of the bank's 2,300 local employees. Other tenants began to occupy floors 10 - 20 in September 198.

In October 1983 Smith Barney Harris Upham & Co. Inc., a stock brokerage, left NCNB Plaza.  Insurance broker Alexander and Alexander moved from Wachovia Center.  Later in the month Brooks Fashion opened a  store in the building.  Wheat, First Securities Inc., a stock brokerage moved from a  space at Northwestern building.  Fashion store The Limited opened a  store.

Previously the firm had leased  on two floors at First Union Plaza. At that time the building was 70% leased. Then later in the same month 3 new tenants signed leases to bring the building to 75% leased. The companies include Chubb & Sons, an insurance underwriting firm, leasing 9,000 square feet on the 17th floor; Sterling Capital Management Co, an investment counseling firm, leasing 5,400 on the 17th floor; and Grier and Grier, a law firm, leased 2,200 square feet on the 2nd floor.

In August 1996 Cousins Properties announced it had reached an agreement to purchase the building for $69.3 million. The sale was finalized in December.  Part of the announcement was possibility of also creating a $300 million uptown basketball and entertainment complex composed of four blocks of Uptown. Cousins announced in December 1997 that it would remodel the  building lobby

At the time of the announcement the company had 225 employees occupying the space. American Financial Realty Trust purchased the building in September 2004 for $100 million from Cousins Properties Inc.  Local property management company Colliers Pinkard was hired to handle leasing. The building was 92% occupied at the time of the sale with Bank of America Corp. and the Robinson, Bradshaw & Hinson law firm as the anchor tenants.

They firm occupied the top 5 floors. At the time of signing the renewal they had 125 local employees and were the second largest law firm in Charlotte after Moore & Van Allen.

The school's goal was to eventually have 2,000 enrolled in the Charlotte campus. Classes began in January 2012.

LRC Properties and Cornerstone Real Estate Advisors purchased 101 Independence Center from previous owner KBS Capital Advisors and Gramercy Property Trust in 2015 for $108 million. Accounting firm CliftonLarsonAllen vacated the tenth floor earlier in 2015 which left  of continuous space available. Few buildings in Uptown Charlotte at that time had that amount of continuous space available.

The company relocated their employees from BB&T Center to the space in early 2015.

In August 2017, an $8 million building renovation began.  The renovations included adding a collobration area to the atrium, new art work in the lobby, and updated hallways and restrooms.

The company issues loans for residential solar projects. Their 20 local employees moved from Packard Place in the first quarter of 2018.

Crescent Communities and Nuveen purchased the building in 2019 from LRC Properties for $132.3 million.  Currently Crescent is spending $25 million to renovate the building.  The renovation will mostly affect the ground floor with the overhaul of the lobby, adding additional outdoor seating, and renovation of future ground floor retail space.  The goal is to make retail more accessible from the street.  Previously most retail was accessible from the interior.

The building was 80% leased as of August 2020,   its tenants included Bank of America, Robinson Bradshaw, Levvel, Northeastern University, and Sunlight Financial and Spaces. The company chose the building due to its close proximity to parking and the light rail. It currently has 90 employees in Charlotte.

In May 2022 Robinson Bradshaw announced they will vacate their space in the building in 2024 when 600 South Tryon is complete to become the anchor tenant occupying  .  The firm will occupy the top 4 floors of the 24 story building that has .  This will be the fourth building in Legacy Union.

In July 2022 Stays by Walker, a short term rental agency, announced they will be leasing  in the building.  The company relocated from Prosperity Place in University Area.  Kay Walker, CEO of Stays Walker, stated this about the space “The proximity to so many of Charlotte's major corporate players will be a huge asset to our company, and our team members will enjoy the property's newly renovated common spaces and top-of-the-line amenities.  The quality of the improvements of the office space was very high-end and consistent with the high-quality offerings we make to our clients.”

In August 2022 UK based The Bank of London announced it will be leasing  in the building to house the 350 jobs they're creating in Charlotte.  The bank currently has offices in New York and Belfast.  Positions will include software development, compliance and risk, technology operations, infrastructure engineering and business operations.  All jobs are planned to be created by 2026.

In October 2022 building permits revealed that a  food hall will be built on the first floor of the building called Monarch Food Hall.  The food hall management company is Hospitality HQ.  The project is described on the Hospitality HQ website as having 3 bars and artisan food concepts from around the world.  This project is part of Crescent Communities, the building owner's, $25 million renovation of the building.  Construction started in February 2023.  The food hall will include 12 stalls, a full service restaurant occupying , three bars including one that will be outside along North Tryon, and private event space.   It will deliver in late 2023.

See also
 List of tallest buildings in Charlotte
 Uptown Charlotte

References

Office buildings in Charlotte, North Carolina
Office buildings completed in 1983